"Edge of a Broken Heart" is a song by American rock band Bon Jovi. It was written during the making of the album Slippery When Wet, but was not included in the final cut. It appeared on the soundtrack to the 1987 film Disorderlies, as well as the B-side of the hit single "Always".

Overview
The song was not released as a commercially available single and did not chart on the Billboard Hot 100, but it did peak at #38 on the Hot 100 Airplay chart the week ending October 17, 1987. 

The song was later included on the band's 100,000,000 Bon Jovi Fans Can't Be Wrong 2004 box set and was released as an iTunes single. The song was also released on the special double-CD edition of Cross Road.

References

Bon Jovi songs
1987 singles
Songs written by Jon Bon Jovi
Songs written by Richie Sambora
Songs written by Desmond Child
1987 songs
Song recordings produced by Bruce Fairbairn
Mercury Records singles